Puloma was the wife of sage Bhrigu who is considered to be one of the Brahma Rishis in Hindu Vedic scriptures. Bhrigu was one of the mind-born sons of Brahma the creator who was given the honorific of Bramharishi. She was a very virtuous and devoted wife. When she was pregnant with his child, Bhrigu on his morning ablution visit (it is also said that he went out to perform religious rites) to the river had entrusted her to the care of Agni (the fire god). However, at that time  a demon named Puloman came to the ashrama (hermitage) of Bhrigu and saw Puloma who had been betrothed to her in the past. He then made an attempt on her modesty and claimed that he had the right to marry her and carry her away as he had asked for her hand in marriage from her father but her father instead had married her off to Bhrigu.

He tried to abduct her, after Agni had confirmed to him that she was Bhrigu's wife who had married her as per Hindu scriptural rites in his presence. Hearing this, Puloman, who was besotted with Puloma's beauty, switched his form in to a boar and abducted her. Frightened by this development, Puloma gave birth to her son who fell on the ground. In other versions of the legend, the child removes himself from the womb. This son was named Chyavana meaning the "fallen from the womb". The child was shining very bright like the Sun and looking at the baby Puloman was scorched to death leaving behind Puloma and her son.

In Mahabharata

In Mahabharata, as narrated by the bard Sauti, Puloma was the wife of sage Bhrigu and they were staying in a hermitage. She became pregnant.  One day Bhrigu went for his morning ablutions in the river leaving his wife in the ashram at the care of Agni. At that time a rakshasa by name Puloman, who had earlier loved Puloma and had been betrothed to her, came to the ashram and saw Puloma and he was besotted by her beauty. Puloma, as a virtuous wife of Brighu and a host, treated him like a guest and offered him refreshments in spite of his lustful glaring at her. But Puloman enamoured by her beauty wished to abduct and marry her. He then saw Agni, the flames of the sacrificial fire burning in a chamber in the hermitage. Puloman then asked Agni to tell him truthfully the status of Puloma whom he had accepted as his spiritual wife. But Agni was reluctant to reveal the truth as he was scared that Bhrigu would curse him if he told the truth. But on Puloman's insistence, Agni told him the truth that Brighu had married Puloma as per Vedic scriptural rites in his presence as she had only been betrothed to him (rakshasa) and not formally married to her. Hearing this Puloman changed his form to a boar and abducted Puloma.

Frightened by this development, Puloma gave birth to her son who fell on the ground. This son was named Chavana also spelt Cyvana meaning the "fallen from the womb". The child was shining very bright like the Sun and looking at the baby Puloman was scorched to death leaving behind Puloma and her son. (in another version it is said that he was terrified by looking at the child and ran away dropping Puloma on the ground) Puloma, overcome by her plight, cried intensely to the extent that the tears she shed created a river called Vadhusaras which later became the location of the hermitage of her son Chavana when he had become a sage with immense ascetic achievement. Brahma consoled her.

Puloma then came to her ashram and appraised Bhrigu of the events that had happened with her and her son. While Bhrigu was happy to see his son, he was enraged to know from Puloma that it was Agni who had revealed her true identity as Bhrigu's wife to Puloman who was now dead, turned into ashes by their son's brightness. In a fit of rage he cursed Agni saying "Thou shalt eat of all things", meaning to become "omnivorous" or “May you be consumer of all things "Sarva Bhahshaka on this Earth". Agni also became furious to hear this curse and told Bhrigu that his curse was not just as he only spoke the truth. Agni told that he was omnipresent and through his mouth both the gods and the ancestors (pitrus) accept the clean oblations of clarified butter offered to him and hence any offering of unclean things to him would be improper.

He also told Bhrigu that he could also curse him but he refrained from doing so as he was a rishi and a Brahmin. With these words Agni went incognito. Brahma then summoned Agni to his presence and recounted Agni's role in the universe and told him that the curse stands modified as his flames would only consume everything offered to him but his physical body would remain pure. Then Agni reappeared in the universe to perform his natural duties.

In Padma Purana
In another version in Padma Purana (pa 14) it is said that when Bhrigu was searching for samidhas (firewood) for offering to the fire god, the demon Damana went to Bhrigu's ashram looking for the rishi's wife. Agni, seeing Damana, became frightened and disclosed Puloma's hideout in the ashram. When Bhrigu came back and came to know of Agni's action, he cursed him but later agreed to reduce its effect to some extent.

References

Bibliography

Characters in Hindu mythology